Zakia Zouanat (1957 – 30 August 2012) was a Moroccan anthropologist. A researcher at the Institute of African Studies at Mohammed V University, she was an expert in Moroccan Sufism. Her research concerned biographic accounts of important Sufi figures in the 12th to 13th centuries. Zouanat sought to bridge Moroccans educated in French who accessed their religions through Arabic texts. As evidenced by her commentary on the Delos Initiative, she actively sought to promulgate the protection of pilgrimage sites important to Moroccan Sufis, as well as provide context for economic and cultural relevance.

Works
 Ibn Mashish: Maître d'al-Shadili [Ibn Mashish: Master of al-Shadhili], Najah El Jadida, 1998
 (trans.) Paroles d'or de ‘Abd al-‘Azîz al-Dabbâgh: enseignements consignés par son disciple Ibn Mubârak al-Lamtî [Golden words of ‘Abd al-‘Azîz al-Dabbâgh: Lessons recorded by his disciple Ibn Mubârak al-Lamtî], Beirut, 2001.
 Soufisme: quête de lumière [Sufism: a quest for light], preface by Ahmed Toufiq, Koutoubia, 2009
 Le Royaume des Saints [The Kingdom of the Saints], 2011

References

1957 births
2012 deaths
Moroccan anthropologists
Moroccan women anthropologists
20th-century anthropologists
21st-century anthropologists
Academic staff of Mohammed V University

Traditionalist School
Women scholars of Islam